Mark A. Gluck is a professor of neuroscience at Rutgers–Newark in New Jersey, director of the Rutgers Memory Disorders Project, and publisher of the public health newsletter, Memory Loss and the Brain.  He works at the interface between neuroscience, psychology, and computer science, studying the neural bases of learning and memory.  His research spans numerous methodologies, including neurocomputational modeling, clinical studies of brain-damaged patients, functional and structural brain imaging, behavioral genetics, and comparative studies of rodent and human learning.  He is the co-author of Gateway to Memory: An Introduction to Neural Network Models of the Hippocampus and an undergraduate textbook Learning and Memory: From Brain to Behavior (Worth Publishers, 2008).

Graduate and postdoctoral training 

Gluck attended Harvard University as an undergraduate pursuing majors in both Psychology and Computer Science. During these years, Gluck worked under the supervision of William Kaye Estes on connectionist models of basic levels in category hierarchies.  After graduating from Harvard University, Gluck pursued a Ph.D. degree at Stanford University in Cognitive Psychology, under Gordon H. Bower's tutelage.  His dissertation focused on using network models to seek a rapprochement between theories of animal and human learning.  It also included several experimental studies of human learning that validated predictions of the probabilistic category learning model that Gluck and Bower designed, and which was based on a generalization of the Rescorla–Wagner model of Pavlovian conditioning. While at Stanford University and through his postdoctoral training he also worked with Richard F. Thompson on computational models of the neural bases of Pavlovian conditioning.

Rutgers–Newark 

Gluck became a faculty member of the Center for Molecular and Behavioral Neuroscience at Rutgers University-Newark in New Jersey. Gluck began exploring the functional role of the hippocampus in learning and memory in collaboration with his new postdoctoral fellow, Catherine E. Myers.  The following year, Gluck and Myers proposed a theory that argued that a wide range of superficially disparate conditioning behaviors that depend on an intact hippocampal region can be understood as being those that require adaptive changes in the underlying representation of stimulus events.

Over the past two decades, Gluck has concentrated on understanding the fundamental principles and mechanisms of learning and memory through the integration of behavioral, biological and computational approaches.  By utilizing novel cognitive tasks, Gluck has studied many disorders that are not traditionally viewed as learning disorders.

One area of his lab concentrates on frontostriatal circuits and dopamine, and their role in learning new associations, skills, and habits; this includes clinical studies of patients with Parkinson's disease, dystonia, frontotemporal dementia, and drug addiction. Another focus is on the hippocampus and medial temporal lobes and their role in supporting new learning by providing contextual and representational constraints on what is learned; this includes clinical studies of patients with Alzheimer's disease, mild cognitive impairment, global anterograde amnesia, and posttraumatic stress disorder.

Research

Parkinson's disease 

Gluck and his lab members are studying memory impairments in patients with Parkinson's disease, a condition characterized by the death of dopaminergic cells in the substantia nigra. He is studying the cognitive effects of this dopaminergic cell death, as well as cognitive effects from the dopamine-replenishing medications.  Utilizing computational modeling as well as studying patient populations, Gluck and his lab members have uncovered novel findings with regards to Parkinson's disease.  Specifically, Gluck has studied the effects of dopaminergic medication on reward and punishment learning in patients with Parkinson's disease.  Gluck, working with his Hungarian collaborator, Szabolcs Keri, has also studied the effects of the alpha-synuclein molecule on reward and punishment learning, and has shown parallels with those who have alpha-synuclein with unmedicated Parkinson's patients. Currently, Gluck and his lab members are investigating the cognition of patients with Parkinson's disease who develop impulse control disorders.

Alzheimer's disease 

Gluck, Myers, and their colleagues have developed hippocampal-sensitive learning tasks that predict future onset of Alzheimer's disease in humans as well as in mouse models.

Major depressive disorder 

Gluck studied how patients with major depressive disorder who are taking anticholinergics demonstrate opposite learning patterns as compared to those not on anticholinergics.

Currently Gluck is studying the effects of depression on patients with Parkinson's disease.

Schizophrenia 
Gluck conducts clinical and computational studies to better understand the links between the cognitive and psychiatric symptoms in schizophrenia.  Recently, Gluck has found connections between the general functioning of schizophrenic patients and their performance on reward and punishment learning.

Outreach programs

Rutgers–Israel Biomedical Research & Education Exchange 
Partnering with Israeli universities, hospitals, and army, Gluck has initiated several programs which strengthen ties between Rutgers and Israel, including two international US-Israeli-Palestinian brain conferences in Jerusalem (co-hosted by Hebrew University and Al-Quds University), a joint US Navy/Israeli Army study of posttraumatic stress disorder, studies of Parkinson's disease and cognition (with University of Haifa and Tel HaShomer hospital), and summer internship opportunities for Rutgers students in Israeli research labs.

Palestinian Neuroscience Initiative & Rutgers/Al-Quds Brain Research Exchange 
Gluck has established a new brain research and education exchange between Rutgers–Newark and Al-Quds University Medical School in the Palestinian Territories/West Bank, which encompasses programs in basic neuroscience, clinical neurology, psychiatry, neuropsychology, and geriatrics, and is intended to lead towards the foundation of a future Palestinian Neuroscience Institute at Al-Quds University Medical School.

African American Alzheimer's Awareness & Brain Health Initiative 
Minority and economically disadvantaged seniors are at greater risk for Alzheimer's disease, due to environmental, lifestyle and behavioral factors.  In collaboration with local community organizations, Gluck is developing educational and memory fitness programs to promote memory health, cognitive vitality, and a better understanding of Alzheimer's disease among seniors.

Memory Loss & The Brain newsletter 
Memory Loss & the Brain, is a free public health newsletter, produced by Gluck which communicates to a wide audience the latest news and information about memory impairments due to disease, injury, and aging, and current findings on how they can be treated.

Personal life 
Gluck lives in the Greenwich Village neighborhood of New York City, where he was an early founding member of the Downtown Boathouse.

Awards 
 Office of Naval Research (ONR) Young Investigator Award
APA Distinguished Scientific Award for an Early Career Contribution to Psychology
National Science Foundation (NSF) Presidential Early Career Award for Scientists and Engineers

References

External links 
 Gluck Lab Online
 Mark A. Gluck's Faculty Profile at Rutgers–Newark

Living people
American cognitive neuroscientists
Jewish scientists
Memory researchers
Rutgers University faculty
Harvard University alumni
Stanford University alumni
Year of birth missing (living people)
Recipients of the Presidential Early Career Award for Scientists and Engineers